Erick Flores Bonfim or simply Erick Flores (born April 30, 1989 in Rio de Janeiro) is a Brazilian attacking midfielder who plays for Remo.

Career

Flamengo
Erick is considered one of the most talented young players of Flamengo. After catching everyone attention inside the club, he got promoted to the first-team in the first half of 2008 and signed his first professional contract until December 31, 2012. His first official match was on Mineirão coming from the bench in the 1-1 draw against Atlético Mineiro on July 9, 2008.

Ceará
For the 2010 season Flamengo loaned out Erick to the recently Brazilian Série A promoted club Ceará expecting him to get more first team experience.

FK Kukësi
He left Boavista and Brazil for the first time in his professional career to join Albanian Superliga side FK Kukësi ahead of the Europa League first qualifying round. He made his FK Kukësi and European debut on 2 July 2015 against Belarusian side FC Torpedo-BelAZ Zhodino in the first qualifying round of the Europa League, where he played the full 90 minutes in the 2–0 win.

In the second match of second qualifying round, Flores scored the third goal of the team in the 32nd minute of the match, in an eventual 4–2 away win, helping Kukësi to qualify in the next round with the aggregate 4–3.

In the 2015-2016 season, he established himself as a regular starter for the club since his arrival from Brazil. He scored 6 league goals in 30 league appearances in which he started in every game he played in the league, along with 2 goals in the Albanian Cup. On 25 April 2016, his season ended early with a knee injury which is likely to keep him out for in between 4–6 months.

Career statistics
As of 5 December 2011

according to combined sources on the Flamengo official website and Flaestatística.Erick Flores stats at Flestatística  

In 2010 Erick played for Náutico in the Brazilian Série B.
In 2011 Erick played for Duque de Caxias in the Brazilian Série B.

Honours

Flamengo
Campeonato Carioca: 2009
Campeonato Brasileiro Série A: 2009

Remo
Copa Verde: 2021
Campeonato Paraense: 2022

References

External links
Player Profile @ Flapedia 

1989 births
Living people
Brazilian footballers
Brazilian expatriate footballers
CR Flamengo footballers
Ceará Sporting Club players
Boavista Sport Club players
Clube Náutico Capibaribe players
Duque de Caxias Futebol Clube players
Itumbiara Esporte Clube players
Avaí FC players
FK Kukësi players
Criciúma Esporte Clube players
Brasiliense Futebol Clube players
Campeonato Brasileiro Série A players
Campeonato Brasileiro Série B players
Campeonato Brasileiro Série C players
Campeonato Brasileiro Série D players
Kategoria Superiore players
Brazilian expatriate sportspeople in Albania
Expatriate footballers in Albania
Association football midfielders
Footballers from Rio de Janeiro (city)